Nicholsonella is an extinct genus of bryozoans of uncertain taxonomic placement. Its colonies can take the forms of thick branching masses or branches.

Species

References

Prehistoric bryozoan genera